Cautley Spout is England's highest (cascade) waterfall above ground. (Gaping Gill on Ingleborough falls a greater unbroken distance into a pothole, and Hardraw Force has a greater unbroken fall above ground).   The broken cascade of falls tumbles a total of 650 feet (198 m) down a cliff face at the head of a wild and bleak glacial valley that comes down from a high plateau called The Calf. It is located in the Howgill Fells, traditionally in the West Riding of Yorkshire but now in the administrative county of Cumbria on the western edge of the Yorkshire Dales National Park. The waterfall is just north of Sedbergh. This fall is one of the few cascade falls in England; most are either tiered or plunge falls.

References

External links
The Walking Englishman: Waterfalls in the Yorkshire Dales

Waterfalls of Cumbria
Tourist attractions in Cumbria
Cascade waterfalls
Sedbergh